James Weldon Johnson Park station (formerly Hemming Park station) is a Jacksonville Skyway monorail station in Jacksonville, Florida. It is located on Hogan Street between Duval Street and Monroe Street in Downtown Jacksonville. The station is adjacent to James Weldon Johnson Park and is located near Jacksonville City Hall and various other government buildings and amenities.

History
The James Weldon Johnson Park station was planned as part of the Jacksonville Skyway's first extension: a north–south route leading from Central station up to Florida State College at Jacksonville. Work on the new segment began in 1993 and coincided with the Skyway's transition from Matra to Bombardier Transportation technology. The extension, including James Weldon Johnson Park Station and Rosa Parks Transit Station near FCCJ, began operation on December 15, 1997.

The next stations on the line are Rosa Parks Transit Station to the north and Central station to the south. Nearby points of interest include James Weldon Johnson Park, the Jacksonville Main Library, Jacksonville City Hall, the Museum of Contemporary Art Jacksonville, and the John Milton Bryan Simpson United States Courthouse.

James Weldon Johnson Park's managers have announced plans to build a 50-by-50-foot permanent stage at the base of the Skyway station for events held in the park.

The adjoining park and station were renamed in 2020. Hemming Park park had been named after Confederate solder Charles Hemming, who donated a war memorial that was displayed at the park. The memorial was removed and the park was instead named after writer and civil rights activist James Weldon Johnson.

References

Jacksonville Skyway stations
Railway stations in the United States opened in 1997
Laura Street
1997 establishments in Florida